The Journal of Orthodontics is a quarterly peer-reviewed medical journal published by Maney Publishing on behalf of the British Orthodontic Society, of which it is the official journal. It was established in 1974 as British Journal of Orthodontics, before obtaining its current title in 2000.

Abstracting and indexing 
The journal is abstracted and indexed in MEDLINE/PubMed and CINAHL.

See also 

 List of medical journals

References

External links 
 

Dentistry journals
English-language journals
Taylor & Francis academic journals
Quarterly journals
Publications established in 1974
Orthodontics